David M. Donnelly (born February 2, 1962 in Edmonton, Alberta) is a Canadian retired professional ice hockey forward who played 137 games in the National Hockey League for the Boston Bruins and Chicago Blackhawks. Internationally Donnelly played for the Canadian national team at the 1984 Winter Olympics

Career statistics

Regular season and playoffs

International

External links
 

1962 births
Living people
Boston Bruins players
Canadian ice hockey forwards
Chicago Blackhawks players
EV Landshut players
Hershey Bears players
Ice hockey players at the 1984 Winter Olympics
KalPa players
Maine Mariners players
Minnesota North Stars draft picks
NCAA men's ice hockey national champions
North Dakota Fighting Hawks men's ice hockey players
Olympic ice hockey players of Canada
St. Albert Saints players
Ice hockey people from Edmonton